Nils Martin Pratley (born 21 May 1967) is a British journalist. He is financial editor of The Guardian.

Early life
He was born in south-west Surrey. He lived in his early life at St George's Wood in Haslemere, south-west Surrey; this house was built for the Scottish fantasy writer George MacDonald. He is the son of Eva Kellgren and Clive William Pratley. His sister, Helen Ingrid Pratley, was born 23 June 1970.

His father, Clive, was a former student president of the University of Hull in the early 1960s when aged 34; having previously been an army officer.

Nils takes his first name from his maternal grandfather, Nils Kellgren, a Swedish journalist and involved in Swedish social democratic politics.

Career

Sunday Business
Pratley was Deputy City Editor (1999–2001) and later City Editor (2001-2002) of the broadsheet national title Sunday Business.

The Guardian
He joined The Guardian in February 2003 as Associate City Editor, later rising to Financial Editor. Since 2016, Pratley has also been a board member of The Scott Trust, representing the paper's journalists.

Personal life
He lives in Stoke Newington. He married Nicola Irvine in June 2003 in the London Borough of Hounslow. They have two children.

See also
 Larry Elliott, the other Guardian business journalist

References

External links
 Guardian profile
 His blog

1967 births
British business and financial journalists
British people of Swedish descent
People from Haslemere
People from Stoke Newington
The Guardian journalists
Living people